Alexander Fuks (30 May 1917 – 29 November 1978) was a German-born, later Israeli historian, archaeologist and papyrologist. He worked with Victor Tcherikover and Menahem Stern on the standard edition of Jewish papyri. He was a specialist in the study of Hellenistic Judaism.

References

Papyrologists
1917 births
1978 deaths
German emigrants to Israel
20th-century Israeli historians
Israeli archaeologists
Writers from Wrocław
20th-century German historians
20th-century archaeologists